William A. Campos (born October 7, 1974) is an American politician from Prince George's County, Maryland convicted for corruption in 2018. He served in the Maryland House of Delegates and on the Prince George's County Council.

Early life
Born in El Salvador, Campos attended Eleanor Roosevelt High School in Greenbelt, Maryland; the University of Maryland, College Park, receiving a B.A. in ancient art history & archaeology; and the University of Maryland, University College, receiving a B.S. in computer studies & information systems.

Political career
Prior to holding office, Campos in 2002 was an aide to then-Delegate Victor R. Ramirez, District 47, Prince George's County.

Campos represented District 2 on the Prince George's County Council for ten years, winning a special election in 2004 when his predecessor resigned, and subsequently being elected to two four-year terms.

Subject to term limits, he then ran for, and won, the District 47B seat in the House of Delegates. He served in the House of Delegates for nine months.

Campos resigned his House seat on September 10, 2015, for "personal reasons", citing "his recent marriage, desire to start a family and lack of employment outside the State House."

Conviction
On January 5, 2017, Campos pleaded guilty to accepting about $40,000 to $50,000 in bribes and kickbacks in exchange for official favors. As part of the plea agreement, Campos was required to give up the money he collected in the scheme and pay restitution of at least $340,000. He also faced up 15 years in prison for the bribery and conspiracy charges. Campos was sentenced in May 2018 to 54 months in prison, to be followed by three years of supervised release. It was reported in June 2020 that amid the COVID-19 pandemic Campos was transferred to a halfway house in the Baltimore area to complete his sentence more than a year before his projected release date.

Election results

2004
{| class="wikitable"
|+ 2004 Prince George's County Council General Election Results, District 2
|-
! Candidate !! Votes !! Party !! Percentage
|-
| Will Campos || 16,308 || Democratic || 88.5% (Winner)
|-
| Tommy S. Priestley || 2,119 || Republican || 11.5%
|}

2006
{| class="wikitable"
|+ 2006 Prince George's County Council General Election Results, District 2
|-
! Candidate !! Votes !! Party !! Percentage
|-
| Will Campos || 10,917 || Democratic || 97.9% (Winner)
|-
| Anthony Cicoria || 159 || Democratic (write in) || 1.4%
|-
| Other Write-Ins || 74 ||  || 0.7%
|}

2010
{| class="wikitable"
|+ 2010 Prince George's County Council Primary Election Results, District 2
|-
! Candidate !! Votes !! Party !! Percentage
|-
| Will Campos || 4,041 || Democratic || 78.8% (Winner)
|-
| Dottie McNeill || 784 || Democratic || 15.3%
|-
| Sabrena Turner|| 305 || Democratic || 5.9%
|}

{| class="wikitable"
|+ 2010 Prince George's County Council General Election Results, District 2
|-
! Candidate !! Votes !! Party !! Percentage
|-
| Will Campos || 11,198 || Democratic || 99.4% (Winner)
|-
| Other Write-Ins|| 67 ||  || 0.6%
|}

2014
{| class="wikitable"
|+ 2014 House of Delegates Primary Election Results, District 47B
|-
! Candidate !! Votes !! Party !! Percentage
|-
| Will Campos || 1,193 || Democratic || 100.0% (Winner)
|}

{| class="wikitable"
|+ 2014 House of Delegates General Election Results, District 47B
|-
! Candidate !! Votes !! Party !! Percentage
|-
| Will Campos || 3,182 || Democratic || 99.3% (Winner)
|-
| Other Write-Ins || 21 ||  || 0.7%
|}

References

1974 births
American politicians of Salvadoran descent
Hispanic and Latino American state legislators in Maryland
Living people
Maryland politicians convicted of crimes
Democratic Party members of the Maryland House of Delegates
People from Prince George's County, Maryland
Salvadoran emigrants to the United States
University of Maryland, College Park alumni
University of Maryland Global Campus alumni
County commissioners in Maryland